This is a list of cantons of Luxembourg by area.

References

See also 
 List of cantons of Luxembourg by highest point
 List of cantons of Luxembourg by lowest point
 List of cantons of Luxembourg by population
 List of cantons of Luxembourg by population density

Area